James Henry Harris (1832–1891) was an American civil rights advocate, upholsterer, and politician. Born into slavery, he was freed as a young adult and worked as a carpenter's apprentice and worker before he went to Oberlin College in Ohio. For a time, he lived in Chatham, Ontario, where he was a member of the Chatham Vigilance Committee that aimed to prevent blacks being transported out of Canada and sold as slaves in the United States.

During the American Civil War (1861–1865), he was commissioned to organize black troops in Indiana for the 28th United States Colored Infantry Regiment. After the war, he was an educator and politician in North Carolina.

Harris was Raleigh, North Carolina's first African American politician. He became a political leader, helping to found the North Carolina Republican Party, serving as a Raleigh alderman, president of the State Equal Rights League, vice president of the Union League, and chairman of the 1866 Freedmen's Convention. He was elected as a delegate to the state's 1868 constitutional convention, as a member of the North Carolina House of Representatives (1868–1870, and 1883) and of the North Carolina Senate (1872–1874).

Early life
In 1830 or 1832, Harris was born into slavery, with both black and white heritage, in Granville County, North Carolina. On August 3, 1840 he began an apprenticeship with Charles Allen to learn to be a carpenter. Later, he was a self-employed carpenter or upholsterer in Raleigh, North Carolina. He became free at 18 years of age. A certificate of his freedom was issued by the Granville County Clerk's office in 1848.

He left the state and attended Oberlin College in Ohio for two years. He moved to Chatham, Ontario, in the 1850s and was a member of the Chatham Vigilance Committee, which was established before the American Civil War by black abolitionists. Its objective was to prevent people from being kidnapped from Canada and returned or sold into slavery in the United States. Some of the members of the group were graduates of Oberlin College in Ohio. He was an agent of the National Emigration Convention. In 1862, he traveled to Sierra Leone Colony and Protectorate and the Colony of Liberia. He supported the exploration of the Niger Valley by Martin Delany.

Civil War activity
After the outbreak of the American Civil War, Harris was commissioned in 1863 by Governor Morton as a recruiting officer to organize black troops in Indiana, including the 28th United States Colored Infantry Regiment.

Career

Teaching 
After the end of the war, Harris returned to Raleigh, North Carolina. Having received a teaching certificate from the New England Freedmen's Aid Society, he worked for them as a teacher in Raleigh beginning in June 1865.

Politics 
Harris started his political career in 1865. He was particularly focused on reforms for orphans, women, laborers, and the poor. He was known to be a good orator. His political career started at the National Equal Rights Convention of 1865, when he was the event's vice-president. In 1865, he attended the first Freedman's Convention in the South; Held in Raleigh, he was a representative for Wake County, North Carolina. A committee of white men elected him a state representative at the State Convention in 1865. He was chairman of the 1866 Freedmen's Convention.

He helped found the North Carolina Republican Party in 1867. He was also a leader in the Union League. Harris and a Mr. Lockett met with President Andrew Johnson by 1867. African American men obtained the right to vote by the Reconstruction Acts in 1867. Harris was elected as a delegate at the January 14, 1868 North Carolina Constitutional Convention and represented a predominantly black constituency,. In 1868, it was reported that Harris was "the first negro regularly nominated to Congress in the United States," a nomination he turned down.  He attended the Republican National conventions in 1868, 1872, and 1876. In 1868 Governor William Woods Holden appointed him as one of two black men to the Raleigh Board of Commissioners.

He was president of the National Convention of Colored Men in 1869. The same year, he pressed for ratification of a new education bill after the state public school fund had been depleted. He was a member of the North Carolina House of Representatives (1868–1870, and 1883) and of the North Carolina Senate (1872–1874). He served as a Raleigh alderman, president of the State Equal Rights League, and vice president of the Union League.

He lobbied for legislation for equal rights for blacks, by chairing a delegation that met with U.S. President Ulysses S. Grant and presented a memorial to him. He was the National Black Convention's vice president in 1877.

Harris lost two races for the United States House of Representatives, the first by a slim margin in 1870 to Sion H. Rogers. Harris served as a member of the United States Electoral College in 1872, voting for Ulysses S. Grant.

End of Reconstruction
By 1874, disfranchisement after the Reconstruction era was instituted bt so-called redeemers and state laws passed to take away African Americans' rights that had been granted to them after the Civil War. "Red Shirt" Democrats used scare tactics to prevent African Americans from voting and the Republican party chose to have "lily white" tickets to make it more likely to win elections.

Harris moved to Warren County in 1876. In 1878, his place on the ballot opposing another African-American Republican, James E. O'Hara, contributed to the victory of white Democrat William H. Kitchin.

Harris was a delegate to the Republican National Conventions of 1884, when he was a supporter of Chester A. Arthur's unsuccessful bid for renomination. In the 1888 presidential election, he was elected as a delegate for James G. Blaine. He accepted a position in President Benjamin Harrison's administration, working in the nation's capital.

Oberlin and other community development 
Harris developed what became known as Oberlin, a Raleigh-area community where former slaves were able to own their first homes. Named for Oberlin College, is it considered one of Harris' significant accomplishments. The community is located along Clark Avenue, Wade Avenue, and Oberlin Road. For freedmen to finance the purchase of land and homes, Harris founded the Raleigh Cooperative Land and Building Association.

He helped found the Negro branch of the North Carolina Institute for the Deaf, Dumb, and Blind, which was the first school for blind African-Americans in the nation. He was a member of the North Carolina Agricultural Society for his lifetime.

North Carolina Republican 
Harris returned to Raleigh in 1880 and started a newspaper, the North Carolina Republican. which was produced on "behalf of the Republican party and the advancement of the negro."

Personal life
He married Bettie Miller, with whom they had two children, Florence (died in 1876 or 1889) and David Henry Harris (died 1935). Harris died in Washington, D.C., on May 31, 1891, suddenly of  heart disease. He was buried at Raleigh's Mount Hope Cemetery, which was created after all the plots for blacks had been taken at the City Cemetery.

After his death, he was remembered as a "gifted politician and a talented orator" by Republican and Democratic newspapers. His records are held at the Records Relating to African Americans section of the North Carolina State Archives in Raleigh, North Carolina.

Legacy
A historical marker on Person Street at Davie Street in Raleigh states: "James H. Harris 1832-1891. Black legislator & orator; member 1868 convention; a founder of Republican Party & Union League in N.C. Home was 1 block W. It provides some information about James Henry Harris, but otherwise, there is little known of him. According to journalist Kate Pattison: "It is possible that Harris' legacy was snuffed out by the Reconstruction backlash, while former slaves continued to lose access to education, voting, and hope."

See also 

 African-American officeholders during and following the Reconstruction era
 North Carolina General Assembly of 1868–1869

References

Works cited

External links
Minutes of the Freedmen's Convention
Campbell University
OurCampaigns.com

1832 births
1891 deaths
Republican Party members of the North Carolina House of Representatives
Republican Party North Carolina state senators
1872 United States presidential electors
African-American state legislators in North Carolina
Politicians from Raleigh, North Carolina
19th-century American politicians